The Tregiffian Burial Chamber is a Neolithic or early Bronze Age chambered tomb. It is near Lamorna in west Cornwall, United Kingdom. It is a rare form of a passage grave, known as an Entrance grave. It has an entrance passage, lined with stone slabs, which leads into a central chamber. This type of tomb is also found in the neighbouring Isles of Scilly.

Location
Tregiffian is in southwest Cornwall in the District of Penwith south of Penzance between St Buryan and Lamorna. It lies close to The Merry Maidens stone circle. The site is managed by the Cornwall Heritage Trust on behalf of English Heritage.

Construction
The large stone grave, half of which was covered by a road in 1846, was, unlike Cornish quoits, for the most part covered with soil, with only the entrance exposed. From the edge of the site a passage, covered by four 3 m long stones, led to the 4-metre deep grave chamber. In front of the chamber, a cross-lying ornate stone, with cup-and-ring markings, formed a barrier. The original stone is in Truro, in the Royal Cornwall Museum, the local stone is a replica. Inside the tomb there was the chamber grave, which consisted of upright stones and a cover slab. Tregiffian probably formed a holy place with the Merry Maidens and other sites.

Excavations

In 1871 William Copeland Borlase carried out the first excavations on the grave. He first discovered the stone edge of the cover and found flints, bones and ashes.  During deeper excavations Borlase discovered pits with bone remains, which suggested cremation. In 1932 Hencken noted for the first time that it was probably a variant of a Megalithic grave and placed this grave type temporally between the dolmen and the cist type. Newer research recognized  passage tombs as a variant of the dolmen type, notable particularly by the entrance to the interior. Urns were discovered in comprehensive excavations in the years 1968 and 1972, and the contents were dated to roughly 1900 BC. The occurrence of these two forms of burial is typical of an Entrance grave and suggests its use as a community grave for a long period of time.

References

External links

Tregiffian page at English Heritage

History of Cornwall
Bronze Age sites in Cornwall
English Heritage sites in Cornwall
Buildings and structures in Cornwall